What a Heart Is Beating For is a 2007 album by Chris Rice. CCM Magazine reviewed the album as "a collection of new songs full of introspective lyrics and beautiful musical arrangements." The song "Lemonade" was released as a single.

Track listing 

All tracks written and composed by Chris Rice.
 "So Much For My Sad Song" – 3:53
 "What a Heart Is Beating For" – 5:16
 "Pardon My Dust" – 3:16
 "Love Is Gonna Break Through" – 3:56
 "You Don't Have To Yell" – 4:11
 "Punch Lines and Ironies" – 4:09
 "Lemonade" – 3:05
 "Here Come Those Eyes" – 2:31
 "Let the Words Escape" – 4:07
 "Sneakin' Into Heaven" – 3:33
 "Tell Me the Story Again" – 3:22
 "Kids Again" – 3:14
 "Baby Take Your Bow" – 2:30

Personnel 

 Chris Rice – lead and backing vocals, acoustic piano, Fender Rhodes
 Monroe Jones – keyboards (3, 6)
 Jeff Roach – keyboards (3, 6)
 Jerry McPherson – guitars (1, 2, 3, 5, 7–13)
 Paul Moak – guitars (1, 5, 6)
 Steve Lywicke – guitars (4)
 Mark Hill – bass
 Ken Lewis – drums, percussion 
 David Angell – strings
 John Catchings – strings
 David Davidson – strings
 Kristin Wilkinson – strings

Production

 Monroe Jones  – producer, recording
 Jim Dineen – recording
 Steve Blackmon – assistant engineer
 Kyle Ford – assistant engineer
 Buckley Miller – assistant engineer
 F. Reid Shippen – mixing
 Andrew Mendleson – mastering at Georgetown Masters, Nashville, Tennessee.
 Matt Lehman – artwork (for Invisible Associates)
 Jeremy Cowart – photography

References 

2007 albums